Suramanovo (Soraman) is a rural locality (a village) in Amangildinsky Selsoviet, Uchalinsky District, Bashkortostan, Russia. The population was 291 as of 2010. There are 5 streets.

Geography 
Suramanovo is located 62 km southwest of Uchaly (the district's administrative centre) by road. Kuchukovo-Mayak is the nearest rural locality.

References 

Rural localities in Uchalinsky District